Spitzkofel (2,717 m) is a mountain of the Lienz Dolomites in East Tyrol, Austria. 

The local mountain for the village of Leisach in the Lienz District, Spitzkofel is the most rugged peak of the Lienz Dolomites. It was probably first claimed in 1798 and is still a popular hiking peak, with excellent views from its summit towards the main town of Lienz, across the Lienz Dolomites, Austria's highest peak Großglockner, Großvenediger and the Carnic Alps.

References

Mountains of the Alps
Mountains of Tyrol (state)
Two-thousanders of Austria
Lienz Dolomites